Frederick Spencer Grace OAM (16 January 1907 – 29 September 1999) was born in Mosman, New South Wales. He was educated at North Sydney Boys High School. He became Managing Director of Automatic Totalisators Limited. He was a lifetime member of the North Shore Rowing Club, and went on to compete for Australia at the 1948 Summer Olympics, in the double sculls with Ted Bromley.

References

1907 births
1999 deaths
Olympic rowers of Australia
Rowers at the 1948 Summer Olympics
Australian male rowers
People educated at North Sydney Boys High School